HMS Grebe was the Royal Navy designation for the prewar Alexandria airport, known as Dekheila, during its use in World War II as a shore base for aircraft of the Fleet Air Arm (FAA). Coordinates are given as  also known as LG-34, and renumbered as LG-235.

History 
Originally used as a shore base for aircraft flown ashore from aircraft carriers by the FAA (as HMS Nile II, under the control of ), the airfield was taken over by the Royal Egyptian Air Force on the outbreak of World War II, but remained in use by the FAA. The field was subsequently loaned as a Naval Air Station on 16 September 1940, and commissioned as HMS Grebe, attached to HMS Nile, with a capacity of 72 aircraft. The field became self accounting on 1 April 1941, and acted as a base for all FAA units in Egypt and the Western Desert, as well as a fleet requirements unit. HMS Nile resumed control on 1 April 1943, retaining the name HMS Grebe.  The field was reduced to a care and maintenance basis on 31 January 1946, before being returned to the control of Egypt on 18 March 1946.

See also
 825 Naval Air Squadron

References 

 RAF Squadrons by C.G. Jefford  page 133

External links
 http://wingcommandergarlick.wordpress.com/2011/03/21/dekheila-airport/
 

Royal Naval Air Stations
World War II airfields in Egypt
Airports in Egypt